Dorati, Doráti is a surname. Notable people with the surname include:

 Antal Doráti (1906–1988), Hungarian-born conductor and composer who became an American citizen
 Nicolao Dorati ( 1513–1593), Italian composer and trombonist